Benjamin Thornton Montgomery (1819–1877) was an American inventor, landowner, and freedman in Mississippi. He was taught to read and write English, and became manager of supply and shipping for Joseph Emory Davis at Hurricane Plantation at Davis Bend.

Early life
Ben Montgomery was born into slavery in 1819 in Loudoun County, Virginia. In 1837, he was sold south, and purchased in Natchez, Mississippi, by Joseph Emory Davis. The planter's much younger brother, Jefferson Davis, later became the President of the Confederate States of America. Montgomery escaped but was recaptured. Davis reportedly "inquired closely into the cause of his dissatisfaction", whereby the two men reached a "mutual understanding" about Montgomery's situation.

Davis assigned Montgomery to run the general store of his plantation at Davis Bend. It was not uncommon for a slave to serve in this position. Impressed with his knowledge and abilities to run the store, Davis placed Montgomery in charge of overseeing the entirety of his purchasing and shipping operations on the plantation.

On May 21, 1847, Montgomery's son, Isaiah Montgomery, was born to him and his wife. Due to Ben's favored position among the Davis Bend slaves, Isaiah was also given the opportunity of receiving an education. Montgomery maintained a close relationship with his son up until his death.

Career 
Montgomery learned a variety of skills, including reading, writing, land surveying, flood control, architectural design, machine repair, and steamboat navigation. Montgomery developed proficiencies in many areas; he became a skilled mechanic, not only repairing the advanced agricultural machinery acquired by the Davis brothers, but eventually applied for a patent for his design of a steam-operated propeller to provide propulsion to boats in shallow water.

The propeller could cut into the water at different angles, thus allowing the boat to navigate more easily through shallow water. This was not a new invention, but an improvement on similar designs invented by John Stevens in 1804 and John Ericsson in 1838.() On June 10, 1858, on the basis that Ben, as a slave, was not a citizen of the United States, and thus could not apply for a patent in his name, he was denied this patent application in a ruling by the United States Attorney General's office. It ruled that neither slaves nor their owners could receive patents on inventions devised by slaves. Later, both Joseph and Jefferson Davis attempted to patent the device in their names but were denied because they were not the "true inventor." After Jefferson Davis later was selected as President of the Confederacy, he signed into law the legislation that would allow slaves to receive patent protection for their inventions. On June 28, 1864, Montgomery, no longer a slave, filed a patent application for his device, but the patent office again rejected his application.

Joseph Davis allowed captive Africans on his plantation to retain money earned commercially, so long as they paid him for the labor they would have done as farmworkers. Thus, Montgomery was able to accumulate wealth, run a business, and create a personal library.

Ownership of Davis Bend 

The Davis family left Davis Bend in 1862, ahead of oncoming troops from the Union Army. Montgomery assumed control of the plantation. Farming continued despite difficulties created by the war, such as attacks from the military forces of both sides.

Following the end of the American Civil War, Joseph Davis sold his plantation and property to Montgomery, in 1866, for the sum of $300,000 as part of a long-term loan.

In September 1867, Montgomery became the first Afro-American official elected in Mississippi, when he was elected justice of the peace of Davis Bend. Under his supervision, the plantation produced cotton judged to be the best in the world at an International Exposition in 1870.

With his son Isaiah, Montgomery established a general store known as Montgomery & Sons. Montgomery worked toward his lifelong dream of establishing a community for freed slaves. He never lived to see his dream come to fruition. Catastrophic floods ruined the crops and cut a channel across the peninsula, turning Davis Bend into an island. This added to the expenses of getting supplies to the plantation and crops to market. When Montgomery failed to make a payment on the loan in 1876, Davis Bend automatically reverted to the Davis family as per the terms of the original contract.  Heartbroken, Montgomery died the next year. He was interred in Brierfield Plantation Cemetery,
Le Tourneau, Warren County, Mississippi.

Legacy 
After his father's death, Isaiah Montgomery worked to realize his dream. He purchased  between the Vicksburg and Memphis railroad lines in northwest Mississippi for the purpose of establishing the community of freed slaves his father dreamed of. Along with other former slaves, Isaiah Montgomery established the town of Mound Bayou, Mississippi; in 1887 and developed it as a majority African-American community.

References

Sources 
 Hermann, Janet Sharp. The Pursuit of a Dream. Oxford University Press, 1981. 
 Hermann, Janet Sharp. "Reconstruction in Microcosm: Three Men and a Gin", Journal of Negro History 65.4, Autumn 1980. 
 Verney, Kevern J. "Trespassers in the land of their birth: Blacks and landownership in South Carolina and Mississippi during the Civil War and Reconstruction, 1861–1877," Slavery and Abolition 4.1, June 2008.

External links

1819 births
1877 deaths
19th-century American inventors
19th-century American slaves
American freedmen
African-American inventors
African-American businesspeople
19th-century American businesspeople